Cryptosepalum diphyllum is a species of legume in the family Fabaceae. It is found only in Nigeria. It is threatened by habitat loss.

References

Flora of Nigeria
Endangered plants
Taxonomy articles created by Polbot
diphyllum